WNCQ-FM (102.9 FM) is a radio station licensed to Canton, New York, United States. It airs a country music format. The station is owned by the Stephens Media Group.

The station had been owned by Martz Communications Group, and was acquired by Stephens on February 1, 2008.

References

External links

NCQ-FM
Country radio stations in the United States